South Alabama Regional Airport at Bill Benton Field , formerly known as Andalusia-Opp Airport, is a public use airport in Covington County, Alabama, United States. The airport is governed by the South Alabama Regional Airport Authority, with members appointed by the Andalusia City Council, the Opp Council, and the Covington County Commission.

This airport is included in the FAA's National Plan of Integrated Airport Systems for 2011–2015 and 2009–2013, both of which categorized it as a general aviation facility.

The Andalusia-Opp Airport Authority voted in May 2007 to change the name of the airport to South Alabama Regional Airport.

Facilities and aircraft 
South Alabama Regional Airport covers an area of 615 acres (249 ha) at an elevation of 310 feet (94 m) above mean sea level. It has one runway designated 11/29 with an asphalt surface measuring 6,000 by 100 feet (1,829 x 30 m).

For the 12-month period ending June 16, 2009, the airport had 62,750 aircraft operations, an average of 171 per day: 81% military and 19% general aviation. At that time there were 18 aircraft based at this airport: 89% single-engine and 11% multi-engine.

References

External links 

 Aerial image as of February 1997 from USGS The National Map
 
 

Airports in Alabama
Transportation buildings and structures in Covington County, Alabama